Statistics of Nemzeti Bajnokság I for the 1902 season.

Overview
It was contested by 5 teams, and Budapesti TC won the championship.

League standings

Results

References
Hungary - List of final tables (RSSSF)

Nemzeti Bajnokság I seasons
1902 in Hungarian football
Hun
Hun